Hasna Mohamed Dato (born 10 November 1959) is a Djiboutian politician and a member of the Pan-African Parliament from Djibouti.

Dato was born in Obock and is a member of the People's Rally for Progress (RPP). She was elected to the National Assembly of Djibouti in the January 2003 parliamentary election as the 35th candidate on the candidate list of the Union for a Presidential Majority (UMP) coalition in Djibouti Region. Following this election, she was chosen as the Secretary-Rapporteur of the Legislation and General Administration Commission in the National Assembly on 26 January 2003.

On 10 March 2004, Dato was chosen by the National Assembly as one of Djibouti's initial five members of the Pan-African Parliament.

See also
 List of members of the Pan-African Parliament

References

1959 births
Living people
Members of the National Assembly (Djibouti)
Members of the Pan-African Parliament from Djibouti
People from Tadjourah Region
People from Djibouti (city)
People's Rally for Progress politicians
Djiboutian women in politics
21st-century women politicians
Women members of the Pan-African Parliament